Testis-specific Y-encoded-like protein 2 is a protein that in humans is encoded by the TSPYL2 gene.

References

Further reading